The 2006–07 Leinster Rugby season was Leinster's sixth competing in the Celtic League alongside which they competed in the 2006–07 Heineken Cup. The season ended without silverware as the team finished third in the Celtic League and were eliminated at the quarter final stage of the Heineken Cup. The 2006-07 season was the last in which home Celtic League games were played in Donnybrook (future ties have been played at the larger RDS Arena).

Match Attendance 
Leinster average Celtic League attendance was 12,796  (boosted heavily by two games held at Lansdowne Road).

Leinster's tie against Ulster Rugby set a Celtic League record with a sell out attendance of 48,000 at the last ever game at Lansdowne Road.

2006–07 Celtic League Fixtures

2006/07 Heineken Cup Fixtures/Results

See also 
2006–07 Celtic League
2006–07 Heineken Cup

References

2006–07
2006–07 Celtic League by team
2006–07 in Irish rugby union
2006–07 Heineken Cup by team